The Remington Model R-25 is semi-automatic gas-operated rifle manufactured by Remington Arms. The R-25 is Remington's attempt to join the AR market. It features a free-floating Chrom-Moly fluted barrel and is modeled after the classic AR-10. It has no built in iron sights and instead has a Picatinny rail mounted atop the receiver to allow the user to mount their choice of scope or other sighting system. The R-25 is advertised primarily as a hunting rifle, and as such normally comes painted in Mossy Oak camouflage.

References

Remington Arms firearms